
Sittin' on Top of the World is a 1973 studio album by Dean Martin arranged by Van Alexander and produced by Jimmy Bowen. This was Martin's first album to be released for 16 months, and was only his second album not recorded in the country pop style since 1965.

The album became his first new album not to chart for 10 years. It was reissued on CD by Capitol Records in 2006 and Hip-O Records in 2009.

Reception

The initial Billboard review from 26 May 1973 said that "These sound like old, old, cuts..He's also not had an LP out in several years. Very Dixielandish". William Ruhlmann on Allmusic.com gave the album three stars out of five. Ruhlmann said that "Martin's most recent efforts had been commercially negligible, so Bowen was well-advised to try something different, but, especially because Martin albums were becoming so occasional, his audience had largely lost track of him...".

Track listing 
 "I'm Sitting on Top of the World" (Ray Henderson, Sam M. Lewis, Joe Young) - 2:13
 "I Wonder Who's Kissing Her Now" (Joseph E. Howard) - 2:22
 "Smile" (Charlie Chaplin, Geoff Parsons, John Turner) - 2:54
 "Ramblin' Rose" (Joel Sherman, Noel Sherman) - 2:14
 "Almost Like Being in Love" (Alan Jay Lerner, Frederick Loewe) - 2:01
 "It's a Good Day" (Dave Barbour, Peggy Lee) - 2:09
 "At Sundown" (Walter Donaldson) - 2:40
 "When the Red, Red Robin (Comes Bob, Bob, Bobbin' Along)" (Harry M. Woods) - 2:29
 "You Made Me Love You (I Didn't Want to Do It)" (Joseph McCarthy, James V. Monaco) - 2:33
 "I'm Forever Blowing Bubbles" (John Kellette, Jean Kenbrovin) - 2:23

Personnel 
 Dean Martin – vocals
 Van Alexander - arranger	
 Jimmy Bowen - record producer
Ed Thrasher - art direction
John Guess - audio engineer
Allen Zentz
Ricci Martin - photography

References 

1972 albums
Dean Martin albums
Albums produced by Jimmy Bowen
Reprise Records albums